Saratoga Springs is a city in Utah County, Utah, United States. The elevation is 4,505 feet.  It is part of the Provo–Orem, Utah Metropolitan Statistical Area. The city is a relatively new development along the northwestern shores of Utah Lake. It was incorporated on December 31, 1997 and has been growing rapidly since then. The population was 37,696 at the 2020 Census. Saratoga Springs became a city in 2001.

Geography
According to the United States Census Bureau, the city has a total area of 16.61 square miles (26.8 km2), of which 16.51 square miles (26.4 km2) is land and 0.1 square mile (0.3 km2) (1.26%) is water. (This water is mostly Utah lake.)

History
The natural hot springs near the source of the Jordan River inspired early European-American settlers to create a resort known as Beck's Saratoga Springs, named after the original New York resort and owner John Beck. The Beck family opened their resort in 1884 and used it as their residence. With several lodge buildings and amusement park facilities, the resort became a popular location for tourists and visitors. The original buildings were taken down. The resort area has now been redeveloped privately, containing an outdoor pool, clubhouse, bowery, and kitchen facility for groups and parties.

In the early 1990s, landowners began to investigate the possibilities of developing the land around the hot springs and in the foothill locations of the nearby Lake Mountains range. The Utah County land development ordinances were not sufficiently urban in nature, so several landowners sought incorporation as a town. Subsequently, Saratoga Springs incorporated in December 1997. Several hundred acres have since been annexed into the City limits and the City now occupies a somewhat narrow strip running north and south between Utah Lake and the Jordan River on the East and the foothills to the west. The City contains over twenty-one square miles and runs from Pelican Point on the west side of Utah Lake over eleven miles north to the Camp Williams US Army facility in the foothills between Utah and Salt Lake Counties.

On April 2, 2017, Thomas S. Monson, then president of the Church of Jesus Christ of Latter-day Saints, announced that an LDS temple would be built somewhere in Saratoga Springs.

On June 28, 2020, a wildfire known as the Knolls Fire forced the evacuation of around 13,000 people in 3,100 homes in Saratoga Springs.

Government
Saratoga Springs has a manager-by-ordinance form of government. A professional manager is appointed by the City Council to oversee the daily operations of the city.  As of 2014, the mayor of Saratoga Springs is Jim Miller.

Schools

Saratoga Springs is part of the Alpine School District, which covers all of Utah County north of Orem. Due to rapid population growth, Saratoga Springs had to build several elementary schools, followed by its junior high and high schools.

Elementary schools
 Harbor Point Elementary School (fall 2021)
 Springside Elementary School (fall 2016) 
 Riverview Elementary School (fall 2011)
 Thunder Ridge Elementary School (fall 2011)
 Horizon School (fall 2011)
 Sage Hills Elementary School (fall 2009)
 Harvest Elementary School (fall 2006)
 Lakeview Academy K-9 (fall 2006)
 Saratoga Shores Elementary School (fall 2004)

Middle schools
 Vista Heights Middle School (fall 2010)
 Lake Mountain Middle School (fall 2019)

High schools
 Westlake High School (fall 2009)

In addition, a therapeutic girls' school, the New Haven School, opened in 1996.

Demographics

As of the 2010 census Saratoga Springs had a population of 17,781 in 4,387 households and 4,022 families. The racial and ethnic makeup of the population was 89.4% non-Hispanic white, 0.5% African-American, 0.9% Asian, 0.8% Pacific Islander, 0.2% non-Hispanics from some other race, 0.3% Native American, 2.8% from two or more races, and 5.8% Hispanic or Latino. The median age in 2010 was 21.6.

As of the census of 2000, there were 1,003 people, 271 households, and 249 families residing in the town. The population density was 98.2 people per square mile (37.9/km2). There were 301 housing units at an average density of 29.5 per square mile (11.4/km2). The racial makeup of the town was 94.72% White, 0.60% black, 0.10% Native American, 1.00% Asian, 0.50% Pacific Islander, 0.90% from other races, and 2.19% from two or more races. Hispanic or Latino of any race were 3.99% of the population.

There were 271 households, out of which 57.6% had children under the age of 18 living with them, 84.1% were married couples living together, 4.4% had a female householder with no husband present, and 8.1% were non-families. 6.3% of all households were made up of individuals, and 1.8% had someone living alone who was 65 years of age or older. The average household size was 3.70 and the average family size was 3.88.

In the town the population was spread out, with 38.3% under the age of 18, 10.2% from 18 to 24, 32.9% from 25 to 44, 14.9% from 45 to 64, and 3.8% who were 65 years of age or older. The median age was 26 years. For every 100 females, there were 101.4 males. For every 100 females age 18 and over, there were 99.7 males.

The median income for a household in the town was $62,212, and the median income for a family was $61,923. Males had a median income of $44,464 versus $36,739 for females. The per capita income for the town was $20,304. About 3.8% of families and 2.5% of the population were below the poverty line, including 2.7% of those under age 18 and 17.4% of those age 65 or over.

Library
Saratoga Springs is one of the few American cities in the 21st century to have started a municipal library with a majority of donations from volunteers. In 2010, the city council authorized $10,000 in seed money to fund the start of a city library. In 2013, the library had grown so popular that the city council recognized the need for a full-time library and authorized it. As of August 2022, the library has over 8,000 cardholders and a collection of more than 24,000 items. The library also provides additional programs for residents including science nights, story times, Wiggle Worms, a literacy center, and test proctoring. On January 1, 2014, the city library began operating under new full-time hours.

See also

 List of cities and towns in Utah

References

External links

 

Cities in Utah County, Utah
Cities in Utah
Provo–Orem metropolitan area
Populated places established in 1997
1997 establishments in Utah